Evan David Meek (born May 12, 1983) is an American former professional baseball pitcher. He is best known for giving up Derek Jeter's final hit at Yankee Stadium. He has played for the Pittsburgh Pirates and Baltimore Orioles in Major League Baseball (MLB) and was selected to one All-Star Game. Meek has also played for the Kia Tigers of the KBO League.

Amateur career
Meek attended Inglemoor High School in Kenmore, Washington. Afterwards, he played for Midland College in Midland, Texas. Then he transferred at semester to play at Bellevue Community College also in Washington.

Pro career

Minnesota Twins
After being selected by the Minnesota Twins in the 2002 Major League Baseball draft, Meek began playing for the Twins affiliate in the Appalachian League, the Elizabethton Twins. In 2004, Meek played for Elizabethton and the Quad Cities River Bandits. Meek started the 2005 season with the Beloit Snappers. Meek was released by the Twins in June 2005.

San Diego Padres
Meek signed with the San Diego Padres in September 2005. He started the 2006 season with the Lake Elsinore Storm. In August 2006, Meek and a player to be named later, (Dale Thayer), were traded to the Tampa Bay Devil Rays for Russell Branyan.

Tampa Bay Devil Rays
Meek finished the 2006 season with the Visalia Oaks. He pitched the 2007 season for the Montgomery Biscuits.

Pittsburgh Pirates
In the 2007 Rule 5 draft, Meek was selected from the Devil Rays by the Pittsburgh Pirates. This required that Meek remain on the active roster of the Pirates for the entire 2008 season or else the Pirates would have to offer him back to the Devil Rays for half the amount they paid to acquire him.

Meek made his major league debut on April 2, 2008 with the Pittsburgh Pirates. He would record his first career loss in extra innings against the Chicago Cubs on April 7, 2008. Meek made nine relief appearances, going 0–1 with a 6.92 ERA, before being designated for assignment on May 4, 2008. He was offered back per Rule 5 guidelines on May 14. The Pirates paid cash to keep him and sent him down to their minor league teams. After pitching 9 games with the Double-A Altoona Curve, Meek was promoted to the Triple-A Indianapolis Indians.

Meek spent the 2009 season in the bullpen with the Pirates. He finished the season with a 1–1 record in 41 appearances, had a 3.45 ERA, gave up 2 home runs, 0 hit batsmen, 29 walks, 42 strikeouts, a .209 average against, and a 1.34 WHIP, in 47.0 innings pitched.

The 2010 season was Meek's first full season in the Majors. He was often asked by manager John Russell to pitch multiple innings in relief. Meek's performance rivaled other excellent closers like Joakim Soria and Brian Wilson despite not being one himself. Early in the season when Dotel had given up runs in six straight games as the closer, Meek had an opportunity in the role and earned his first Major League save on April 29, 2010 to close out a 2–0 win over the Los Angeles Dodgers. On May 14, 2010 against the Chicago Cubs at Wrigley Field, Meek entered the game in the 6th inning with the score tied 6–6, and he pitched two scoreless innings of relief, striking out four of the seven Cubs hitters he faced including Derrek Lee, Xavier Nady and Alfonso Soriano in the bottom of the 7th. The Pirates rallied behind his strong pitching to win the game 10–6.

Meek delivered one of his finest performances of the season against the Washington Nationals on June 10, 2010, coming in to relieve Pirates starter Zach Duke with the bases loaded and no outs. He quickly forced Willie Harris to line into a double play before retiring Cristian Guzmán, needing only six pitches to get out of the inning with no runs in. Due to his excellent work, he was named to the 2010 MLB All Star Game. At the time of his selection on July 4, 2010, Meek carried a 4–2 record with a 0.96 ERA, a mark that lead all National League relievers. "It's surprising", Meek said. "A lot of starters and closers go to the game. I've always said there are a lot of great middle relievers out there who deserve to go to the game. I think they're overlooked a little bit. It's amazing to be selected, an overwhelming feeling." Meek was the first Pirate reliever selected who was not a closer since Mace Brown in 1938 – before the closer position emerged. The Pirates celebrated his nomination at PNC Park with an 8–5 victory over the visiting Philadelphia Phillies, a game where Meek was the winning pitcher.

On August 3, 2010, Meek recorded his first career base hit, off fellow reliever Jordan Smith of the Cincinnati Reds. Meek finished the 2010 season with a 2.14 ERA, 70 strikeouts, 4 saves, 15 holds, and a 5–4 record, all career-highs.

After several injuries in 2011, Meek saw a decrease in fastball velocity.

Meek started the 2012 season with Pittsburgh, but on May 1, Meek was optioned to Triple-A Indianapolis. Meek was 0-0 with a 5.59 ERA in 9 games with a .293 opposing batting average. He was recalled to the Pirates on July 21, 2012, after an injury to reliever Juan Cruz. But was sent back down on July 26, to make room for highly anticipated prospect Starling Marté. Meek was designated for assignment by the Pirates on September 10, 2012. In October 2012, Meek elected minor league free agency.

Texas Rangers
Meek spent the 2013 season in the Texas Rangers organization with the Triple-A Round Rock Express.

Baltimore Orioles
Meek signed a minor league deal with the Baltimore Orioles in February 2014. After a strong spring training, he made the Opening Day roster. On May 2, he was optioned to the Triple-A Norfolk Tides. He was recalled on May 15, and then designated for assignment on May 16. Instead, the next day Meek was optioned back to Norfolk. On May 28, he was assigned outright to Norfolk. On September 25, 2014, Meek gave up a walk-off single to New York Yankees hall-of-famer Derek Jeter in Jeter's final game at Yankee Stadium. Subsequently, it was also Meek's last game in the MLB.

Washington Nationals
Meek signed  a minor league contract with the Washington Nationals on January 21, 2015.

Kia Tigers
On July 20, 2015, the Kia Tigers of the Korea Baseball Organization announced that they had signed Meek to a one-year deal worth $150,000. Meek filled a roster vacancy created by the club's release of former MLB pitcher Philip Humber on the same day.

Somerset Patriots
On May 5, 2016, Meek signed with the Somerset Patriots of the Atlantic League of Professional Baseball. He was released on July 20, 2016.

Lancaster Barnstormers
On July 26, 2016, Meek signed with the Lancaster Barnstormers of the Atlantic League of Professional Baseball. He became a free agent after the 2016 season.

Scouting report
Meek's four-seam fastball normally sits around 95 mph, although he is capable of reaching 97–98 mph on occasion. It is his primary pitch, throwing it slightly over half the time. Despite missing the final two months of the 2009 Major League Baseball season, he added 8 pounds of muscle during the off-season and promised that he would be able to hit 100 mph in 2010. Since his command has improved throughout his career – 5.55 walks per 9 innings in 2009 to around 2.10 in 2010 – opposing batters have shown more willingness to chase the pitch, even out of the strike zone to due his ability throw his other pitches for strikes.

However, after several injuries in 2011, Meek saw his fastball velocity decrease into the low to mid 90s, ranging from 90-95 mph.

Meek's curveball is his primary off-speed pitch, with the velocity sitting around 79–82 mph.

Meek throws a cutter that was rated in August 2009 as the 3rd most effective cutter in Major League Baseball because of its runs above the MLB average. The pitch has "unfair biting" movement, even against left-handed batters, according to Dejan Kovacevic of the Pittsburgh Post-Gazette. Average velocity is 92–93 mph and he normally likes to use it when he gets ahead in a count as a strikeout pitch. It is normally a very difficult pitch to hit well, helping him limit the number of extra base hits he allows.

Meek also throws a fourth pitch, an off-speed slider that is seldom used in pressure situations. The pitch normally sits around 80–82 mph, mainly incorporated to keep hitters out of a rhythm. His ability to throw four pitches well however, makes him rare as a relief pitcher as the normal reliever only possesses a three-pitch arsenal.

References

External links

1983 births
Living people
Sportspeople from Bellevue, Washington
Baseball players from Washington (state)
Major League Baseball pitchers
National League All-Stars
Pittsburgh Pirates players
Baltimore Orioles players
Elizabethton Twins players
Quad Cities River Bandits players
Beloit Snappers players
Bellevue Bulldogs baseball players
Lake Elsinore Storm players
Visalia Oaks players
Montgomery Biscuits players
Altoona Curve players
Indianapolis Indians players
Bradenton Marauders players
Round Rock Express players
Norfolk Tides players
Scottsdale Scorpions players
Venados de Mazatlán players
American expatriate baseball players in Mexico
Syracuse Chiefs players
Somerset Patriots players
Kia Tigers players
American expatriate baseball players in South Korea